The great-tailed grackle or Mexican grackle (Quiscalus mexicanus) is a medium-sized, highly social passerine bird native to North and South America. A member of the family Icteridae, it is one of 10 extant species of grackle and is closely related to the boat-tailed grackle and the extinct slender-billed grackle. In the southern United States, it is sometimes simply referred to as "blackbird" or (erroneously) "crow" due to its glossy black plumage, and similarly it is often called  ("raven") in some parts of Mexico, although it is not a member of the crow genus Corvus, nor even of the family Corvidae.

Description

Great-tailed grackles are medium-sized birds (larger than starlings and smaller than crows; -) with males weighing - and females between -, and both sexes have long tails. Wingspan ranges from 18.9-22.8 in (48-58 cm). Males are iridescent black with a purple-blue sheen on the feathers of the head and upper body, while females are brown with darker wings and tail. Adults of both sexes have bright yellow eyes, while juveniles of both sexes have brown eyes and brown plumage like females (except for streaks on the breast). Great-tailed grackles, particularly the adult males, have a keel-shaped tail that they can fold vertically by aligning the two halves.

The great-tailed grackle and boat-tailed grackle were considered the same species until genetic analyses distinguished them as two separate species.

Vocalizations 
Great-tailed grackles have an unusually large repertoire of vocalizations that are used year-round. The sounds range from "sweet, tinkling notes" to a "rusty gate hinge". Males use a wider variety of vocalization types, while females engage mostly in "chatter", however there is a report of a female performing the "territorial song". Because of their loud vocalizations, great-tailed grackles are considered a pest species by some.

Breeding
The great-tailed grackle mating season usually begins in early or mid-April. The nest is typically built near the top of a large or medium-sized tree, using materials such as woven grass and twigs, as well as some man-made materials. Females usually lay around 4 to 7 eggs. Incubation is usually around 14 to 13 days and their young usually leave the nest 12 to 17 days after hatching; the parents continue to feed their young several weeks after they have left the nest until they reach maturity. Eggs are bright blue to pale bluish gray in color, marked with swirls and splotches that range from dark brown to black.

Distribution and habitat

Great-tailed grackles originated from the tropical lowlands of Central and South America, but historical evidence from Bernardino de Sahagún shows that the Aztecs, during the time of the emperor Ahuitzotl, introduced the great-tailed grackle from their homeland in the Mexican Gulf Coast to the Aztec capital of Tenochtitlan in the highland Valley of Mexico, most likely to use their iridescent feathers for decoration. In more recent times, great-tailed grackles expanded their breeding range by over 5,500% by moving north into North America between 1880 and 2000, following urban and agricultural corridors. Their current range stretches from northwestern Venezuela and western Colombia and Ecuador in the south to Minnesota in the north, to Oregon, Idaho, and California in the west, to Florida in the east, with vagrants occurring as far north as southern Canada. Their habitat for foraging is on the ground in clear areas such as pastures, wetlands and mangroves, and chaparral. The grackles' range has expanded with agricultural and urban settings.

Diet
Great-tailed grackles are noted for their diverse foraging habits. They extract larvae and insects from grassy areas; eat lizards, nestlings, and eggs; forage in freshly plowed land; remove parasites from cattle, and eat fruits (e.g., bananas, berries) and grains (e.g., maize, corn on the cob by opening the husks). They turn over objects to search for food underneath, including crustaceans, insects, and worms, they hunt tadpoles and fish by wading into shallow water, and although they do not swim, they catch fish by flying close to the water's surface, and are even reported to dive a few inches into the water to retrieve a fish. They are also known to pick dead insects off the license plates of parked cars, and kill barn swallows while flying.

Behavior

Great-tailed grackles communally roost in trees or the reeds of wetlands at night and, during the breeding season, they nest in territories using three different mating strategies: 1) territorial males defend their territory on which many females place their nests and raise young, 2) residential males live in the larger colony but do not defend a territory or have mates, and 3) transient males stay for a few days before leaving the colony to likely move on to another colony. Resident and transient males sire a small number of offspring through extra-pair copulations with females on territories. Territorial males are heavier and have longer tails than non-territorial males, and both of these characteristics are associated with having more offspring.

Great-tailed grackles can solve The Crow and the Pitcher puzzle - a problem involving a tube that is partially filled with water and a floating, out-of-reach piece of food. The problem is solved by dropping objects into the water to raise the level and bring the food within reach. They are also behaviorally flexible, changing their preferences quickly in response to changes in cognitive tasks.

In culture
In Mexico, where it is known as the chanate or zanate, there is a legend that it has seven songs. "In the creation, the Zanate having no voice stole its seven distinct songs from the wise and knowing sea turtle. You can now hear the Zanate's vocals as the Seven Passions (Love, Hate, Fear, Courage, Joy, Sadness, and Anger) of life." Mexican artisans have created icons in clay, sometimes as whistles that portray the sea turtle with the zanate perched on its back.

In Colombia, the species is called the maria mulata, and is the official bird of Cartagena, Colombia.The Cartagena artist Enrique Grau had an affinity for these birds and, because of this inspiration, many Colombian monuments and artistic works were created in honor of the bird's intelligence, adaptability, cheerfulness, sociability, collaborative tendencies, diligence, craftiness, and ability to take advantage of adversity.

In Austin, Texas, it is commonly found congregating near the city's numerous food trucks, and grocery store parking lots. The great-tailed grackle has become an icon in the city, and especially on the campus of the University of Texas at Austin, to the extent that local radio station KUT offers grackle-themed socks as a popular gift for its supporters.

References

Further reading

 Johnson, K., and B. D. Peer. 2001. Great-tailed Grackle (Quiscalus mexicanus) in The Birds of North America No. 576 (A. Poole and F. Gill, eds.). The Birds of North America, Inc., Philadelphia, PA.

External links

 
 Great-tailed grackle - Quiscalus mexicanus - USGS Patuxent Bird Identification InfoCenter
 Great-tailed grackle - Animal Diversity Web
 
 
 
 Great-tailed grackle movies  - Tree of Life
 Great-tailed Grackle - Cornell Lab of Ornithology
 Texas Monthly
 Very diverse Great-tailed grackle sounds from Texas

great-tailed grackle
Native birds of the Southwestern United States
Birds of the Rio Grande valleys
Native birds of the Plains-Midwest (United States)
Birds of Central America
Birds of Colombia
Birds of Costa Rica
Birds of the Tumbes-Chocó-Magdalena
great-tailed grackle
great-tailed grackle